Dunstan Kasi Nsubuga was an Anglican Bishop in Uganda.

Nsubuga was educated at Uganda Christian University. He was ordained deacon in 1944 and priest in 1945. He served the Diocese of Uganda from 1944 to 1961. He was Dean of Namirembe from 1961 to 1965 when he was consecrated an Assistant Bishop

He was awarded an honorary Doctorate of Divinity from St Paul's University, Tokyo in 1958.

References 

Uganda Christian University alumni
20th-century Anglican bishops in Uganda
Rikkyo University
Anglican bishops of Namirembe